Curtin Village, also known as Eagle Ironworks, is a national historic district located in Boggs Township, Centre County, Pennsylvania. The district includes eighteen contributing buildings and three contributing structures in Curtin.

History and features
This historic district is composed of buildings and structures related to an ironworks dating back to 1810, when the village was founded by Roland Curtin, Sr., father of Pennsylvania's Civil War-era governor Andrew Gregg Curtin, and Miles Boggs. It includes an iron master's mansion (1830), a late-19th century Victorian style dwelling, the Eagle Furnace stack (1847), the remains of a grist mill, a number of worker's houses, and an overgrown canal basin.  The Eagle Ironworks closed in 1921. 

The area continues to be conserved by historic preservationists. Owned by the Pennsylvania Historical and Museum Commission, it is operated as the Curtin Village at Eagle Ironworks Historical Site by the Roland Curtin Foundation.

It was added to the National Register of Historic Places in 1971.

References

External links

Curtin Village website

History museums in Pennsylvania
Historic districts on the National Register of Historic Places in Pennsylvania
Federal architecture in Pennsylvania
Buildings and structures in Centre County, Pennsylvania
Blast furnaces in the United States
Ironworks and steel mills in Pennsylvania
National Register of Historic Places in Centre County, Pennsylvania